The Larsemann Hills are a series of low rounded coastal hills along the southeastern shore of Prydz Bay, Antarctica extending for  from Dålk Glacier. They were discovered in February 1935 by Captain Klarius Mikkelsen from the whaling ship Thorshavn, sent out by Norwegian whaling magnate Lars Christensen, and given this name.

The bedrock of the Larsemann Hills contains an unusually high abundance of boron and phosphate minerals and is the location of discovery of four new species of mineral. In 2014, the Stornes Peninsula within the Larsemann Hills was declared an Antarctic Specially Protected Area due to its mineral diversity.

Research stations
As an Antarctic oasis the hills are the home of several Antarctic research stations.
 The abandoned original Russian Progress Station.
 The relocated new Russian Progress II Station.
 The Chinese Zhongshan station
 The Australian-donated Romanian Law-Racoviță-Negoiță Station
 The Indian research station Bharati
 British Antarctic Survey operates four research stations throughout the year in the Antarctic, and one during the summer. It also operates Ny-Ålesund research station in the Arctic on behalf of the Natural Environment Research Council.

References

Antarctic Specially Managed Areas
Oases of Antarctica
Hills of Princess Elizabeth Land
Ingrid Christensen Coast